A list of notable Polish politicians of the former Solidarity Electoral Action party.

A
 Paweł Abramski
 Franciszek Adamczyk
 Andrzej Adamowicz
 Paweł Adamowicz
 Elżbieta Adamska-Wedler
 Mariusz Ambroziak
 Andrzej Andrysiak
 Piotr Andrzejewski
 Andrzej Anusz
 Dorota Arciszewska-Mielewczyk
 Jan Krzysztof Ardanowski
 Wojciech Arkuszewski
 Paweł Arndt
 Marek Ast

B
 Zbigniew Babalski
 Adam Bachleda-Curuś
 Franciszek Bachleda-Księdzularz
 Artur Balazs
 Zdzisław Banat
 Kazimierz Barczyk
 Waldemar Bartosz
 Elżbieta Barys
 Jerzy Barzowski
 Jarosław Bauc
 Teresa Bazała
 Zygmunt Berdychowski
 Józef Bergier
 Adam Biela
 Adam Bielan
 Czesław Bielecki
 Marek Biernacki
 Anna Bogucka-Skowrońska
 Jerzy Borcz
 Jerzy Borowczak
 Ryszard Brejza
 Tadeusz Brzozowski
 Jerzy Budnik
 Leszek Burakowski
 Ryszard Burski
 Józef Buszman
 Jerzy Buzek
 Wojciech Błasiak
 Józef Błaszczeć

C
 Piotr Całbecki
 Franciszka Cegielska
 Michał Chałoński
 August Chełkowski
 Zbigniew Chlebowski
 Jan Chmielewski
 Jan Chodkowski
 Jan Chojnowski
 Zygmunt Cholewiński
 Stanisław Chrobak
 Andrzej Chronowski
 Paweł Chrupek
 Andrzej Chrzanowski
 Wiesław Chrzanowski 
 Zbigniew Chrzanowski
 Stanisław Cieśla
 Grzegorz Cygonik
 Tadeusz Cymański
 Marek Czarnecki
 Ryszard Czarnecki
 Jerzy Czerwiński
 Ignacy Czeżyk
 Krystyna Czuba
 Dorota Czudowska

D
 Władysław Dajczak
 Wojciech Daniel
 
 Edward Daszkiewicz
 Marian Dembiński
 Zdzisław Denysiuk
 Marian Dojka
 Ludwik Dorn
 Andrzej Drętkiewicz
 Jacek Duchnowski
 Waldemar Dudziak
 Henryk Dykty
 Lech Dymarski
 Jerzy Dyner
 Henryk Dyrda
 Józef Dąbrowski
 Jacek Dębski

E
 Zbigniew Eysmont

F
 Joanna Fabisiak
 Zbigniew Farmus
 Kazimierz Ferenc
 Lech Feszler
 Zbigniew Fijak
 Kazimierz Filipiak
 Zbigniew Filipkowski
 Wojciech Frank
 Barbara Frączek
 Józef Frączek

G
 Andrzej Gabryszewski
 Andrzej Gargaś
 Waldemar Gasper
 Roman Giedrojć
 Mieczysław Gil
 Szymon Giżyński
 Adam Glapiński
 Marian Goliński
 Henryk Goryszewski
 Andrzej Maria Gołaś
 Mariusz Grabowski
 Aleksander Grad
 Andrzej Grajewski
 Wojciech Grochowski
 Jerzy Grohman
 Marek Grzelaczyk
 Grzegorz Grzelak
 Alicja Grześkowiak
 Ignacy Guenther
 Wojciech Gulin
 Andrzej Gut-Mostowy
 Jerzy Guła
 Jerzy Gwiżdż
 Józef Górny
 Stanisław Głowacki

H
 Aleksander Hall
 Mirosław Handke
 Andrzej Hardy
 Wojciech Hausner
 Jolanta Hibner
 Przemysław Hniedziewicz
 Stanisław Hoffmann
 Jerzy Hrybacz

I
 Witold Idczak
 Ryszard Iwan
 Stanisław Iwan
 Stanisław Iwanicki

J
 Jan Maria Jackowski
 Jarosław Jagiełło
 Kazimierz Janiak
 Sławomir Janicki
 Jacek Janiszewski
 Michał Janiszewski
 Maciej Stanisław Jankowski
 Maciej Jankowski
 Gabriel Janowski
 Mieczysław Janowski
 Andrzej Jaroch
 Paweł Jaros
 Stanisław Jarosz
 Mirosław Jasiński
 Marian Jaszewski
 Andrzej Jaworski
 Lech Jaworski
 Stanisław Jałowiecki
 Stefan Jurczak
 Krzysztof Jurgiel

K
 Grzegorz Kaczmarzyk
 Jarosław Kaczyński
 Marek Kaczyński
 Aldona Kamela-Sowińska
 Teresa Kamińska
 Krzysztof Kamiński
 Mariusz Kamiński
 Michał Kamiński
 Kazimierz Kapera
 Jacek Karnowski
 Karol Karski
 Tomasz Karwowski
 Michał Kasiński
 Tadeusz Kaszubski
 Elżbieta Kaufman-Suszko
 Leszek Kawski
 Andrzej Kaźmierczak
 Marek Kempski
 Andrzej Kern
 Władysław Kielian
 Tadeusz Kilian
 Wiesław Kilian
 Leszek Kisiel
 Feliks Klimczak
 Anna Knysok
 Zdzisława Kobylińska
 Witold Kochan
 Stanisław Kogut
 Marek Kolasiński
 Longin Komołowski
 Stefan Konarski
 Józef Korpak
 Tadeusz Kowalczyk
 Witold Kowalski
 Janusz Koza
 Andrzej Kozioł
 Jan Kozłowski
 Bartłomiej Kołodziej
 Robert Kościelny
 Mirosław Koźlakiewicz
 Norbert Krajczy
 Zofia Krasicka-Domka
 Ryszard Kraszewski
 Janina Kraus
 Witold Krochmal
 Jerzy Kropiwnicki
 Mirosław Kruszyński
 Piotr Krutul
 Sławomir Kryszkowski
 Andrzej Krzak
 Marian Krzaklewski
 Dariusz Kubiak
 Mirosław Kukliński
 Jan Kulas
 Jacek Kurski
 Krzysztof Kwiatkowski
 Ryszard Kędra
 Krzysztof Kłak
 Dariusz Kłeczek

L
 Krzysztof Laga
 Grażyna Langowska
 Tomasz Latos
 Zbigniew Lech
 Tadeusz Bernard Lewandowski
 Tadeusz Stefan Lewandowski
 Ewa Lewicka-Banaszak
 Leszek Lewoc
 Marcin Libicki
 Edward Lipiec
 Krzysztof Lipiec
 Dariusz Lipiński
 Władysław Lisewski
 Teresa Liszcz
 Wojciech Lubawski
 Józef Lubieniecki

M
 Jan Majchrowski
 Stanisław Majdański
 Krzysztof Majka
 Wojciech Maksymowicz
 Edward Maniura
 Bolesław Marciniszyn
 Kazimierz Marcinkiewicz
 Stanisław Marczuk
 Marek Markiewicz
 Zdzisław Maszkiewicz
 Jerzy Masłowski
 Ryszard Masłowski
 Piotr Mateja
 Ryszard Matusiak
 Marek Matuszewski
 Eugeniusz Matyjas
 Andrzej Tadeusz Mazurkiewicz
 Tadeusz Maćkała
 Ewa Mańkowska
 Cezary Mech
 Ireneusz Michalak
 Marek Michalik
 Krzysztof Michalski
 Tomasz Michałowski
 Konstanty Miodowicz
 Stanisław Misztal
 Marian Miłek
 Józef Mozolewski
 Eugeniusz Moś
 Zbigniew Mroziński
 Jan Musiał
 Maciej Musiał
 Piotr Mync

N
 Jerzy Nalichowski
 Marek Nawara
 Witold Nieduszyński
 Szymon Niemiec
 Stefan Niesiołowski
 Ireneusz Niewiarowski
 Sławomir Nitras
 Czesław Nowak
 Maria Nowak
 Halina Nowina Konopka
 Paweł Nowok

O
 Krzysztof Oksiuta
 Jan Olbrycht
 Jerzy Olejniczak
 Mariusz Olszewski
 Grzegorz Opala
 Władysław Ortyl
 Andrzej Osnowski
 Tomasz Osowski
 Andrzej Ostoja-Owsiany
 Jerzy Ostrouch

P
 Sławomir Pajor
 Tadeusz Parchański
 Ignacy Pardyka
 Jan Parys
 Waldemar Pawłowski
 Janusz Pałubicki
 Cezary Piasecki
 Grzegorz Piechowiak
 Krzysztof Piesiewicz
 Antoni Pietkiewicz
 Leszek Piotrowski
 Maria Piór
 Jan Piątkowski
 Marian Piłka
 Paweł Podczaski
 Jerzy Polaczek
 Piotr Polmański
 Paweł Poncyljusz
 Marian Poślednik
 Andrzej Pruszkowski
 Zdzisław Pupa
 Zbigniew Pusz
 Adam Pęzioł
 Maciej Płażyński
 Elżbieta Płonka

R
 Robert Raczyński
 Józef Ramlau
 Adam Rams
 Jan Rejczak
 Józef Rojek
 Jan Rokita
 Jadwiga Rudnicka
 Maciej Rudnicki
 Roman Rutkowski
 Jacek Rybicki
 Zbigniew Rynasiewicz
 Czesław Ryszka
 Edward Rzepka
 Bogdan Rzońca

S
 Sławomir Sadowski
 Janina Sagatowska
 Franciszek Sak
 Henryk Sapalski
 Andrzej Sasuła
 Grzegorz Schreiber
 Mirosław Sekuła
 Jarosław Sellin
 Zbigniew Senkowski
 Zbigniew Sieczkoś
 Tadeusz Sierżant
 Andrzej Sikora
 Andrzej Sikora
 Waldemar Sikora
 Roman Skrzypczak
 Władysław Skrzypek
 Maria Smereczyńska
 Andrzej Smoliński
 Leszek Smykowski
 Andrzej Sobański
 Anna Sobecka
 Czesław Sobierajski
 Bogusław Sonik
 Tomasz Sowiński
 Grażyna Sołtyk
 Marian Sołtysiewicz
 Maciej Srebro
 Edmund Sroka
 Wiktor Stasiak
 Stanisław Stańdo
 Janusz Steinhoff
 Mirosław Styczeń
 Jerzy Stępień
 Włodzimierz Sumara
 Jacek Swakoń
 Mirosław Swoszowski
 Brunon Synak
 Wojciech Szarama
 Jacek Szczot
 Mieczysław Szczygieł
 Franciszek Szelwicki
 Romuald Szeremietiew
 Andrzej Szkaradek
 Jerzy Szmit
 Grzegorz Szpyrka
 Bartłomiej Szrajber
 Grażyna Sztark
 Stanisław Szwed
 Bernard Szweda
 Hans Szyc
 Antoni Szymański
 Konrad Szymański
 Zbigniew Szymański
 Jan Szyszko
 Tomasz Szyszko

T
 Stanisław Tamm
 Krzysztof Tchórzewski
 Antoni Tokarczuk
 Bogdan Tomaszek
 Ewa Tomaszewska
 Janusz Tomaszewski
 Witold Tomczak
 Ryszard Tur
 Jacek Turczyński
 Bolesław Twaróg
 Jacek Tworkowski
 Antoni Tyczka
 Marcin Tyrna

U
 Kazimierz Michał Ujazdowski
 Arkadiusz Urban
 Andrzej Urbański
 Ligia Urniaż-Grabowska
 Aleksander Usakiewicz
 Piotr Uszok

W
 Urszula Wachowska
 Wiesław Walendziak
 Grzegorz Walendzik
 Piotr Walerych
 Mieczysław Walkiewicz
 Włodzimierz Wasiński
 Jan Waszkiewicz
 Marek Waszkowiak
 Zbigniew Wawak
 Ryszard Wawryniewicz
 Jerzy Widzyk
 Andrzej Wieczorek
 Roman Wierzbicki
 Kazimierz Wilk
 Sławomir Willenberg
 Wilibald Winkler
 Andrzej Wiszniewski
 Edmund Wittbrodt
 Waldemar Wiązowski
 Kazimierz Wlazło
 Teofil Wojciechowski
 Michał Wojtczak
 Andrzej Wojtyła
 Janusz Woźnica
 Andrzej Woźnicki
 Tadeusz Wrona
 Andrzej Wybrański
 Dariusz Wójcik
 Marek Jan Wójcik
 Piotr Wojciech Wójcik
 Tomasz Feliks Wójcik
 Stanisław Wądołowski
 Emil Wąsacz

Z
 Stanisław Zając
 Jadwiga Zakrzewska
 Andrzej Zakrzewski
 Andrzej Zapałowski
 Ireneusz Zarzycki
 Jan Zarębski
 Zbigniew Zarębski
 Artur Zawisza
 Marek Zdrojewski
 Ryszard Zembaczyński
 Sławomir Zgrzywa
 Andrzej Zieliński
 Wojciech Ziemniak
 Zenon Złakowski
 Kosma Złotowski

Ł
 Marek Łatas
 Jan Łopuszański
 Adam Łoziński
 Zygmunt Łupina
 Karol Łużniak
 Paweł Łączkowski

Ś
 Krzysztof Śmieja
 Adam Śnieżek
 Maciej Świątkowski

Ż
 Jarosław Żaczek
 Piotr Żak
 Jacek Żalek
 Czesław Żelichowski
 Jerzy Żurawiecki
 Bogdan Żurek